Pilot Point is a city in Lake and Peninsula Borough, Alaska, United States, on the Alaska Peninsula. As of the 2020 census, the population of the city was 70, up from 68 in 2010.

Geography
Pilot Point is located at  (57.560226, -157.582267). Most of the community (village) is located on a high, ancient glacial moraine which abuts the eastern shore of Ugashik Bay six nautical miles upstream from Smoky Point and eighteen nautical miles (33 km) downstream from the village of Ugashik.

Demographics

Pilot Point first appeared on the 1940 U.S. Census as an unincorporated village. In 1980, it was made a census-designated place (CDP). In 1992, it formally incorporated.

As of the census of 2000, there were 100 people, 29 households, and 22 families residing in the city. The population density was 3.9 people per square mile (1.5/km2). There were 69 housing units at an average density of 2.7 per square mile (1.0/km2). The racial makeup of the city was 14.00% White and 86.00% Native American.

There were 29 households, out of which 58.6% had children under the age of 18 living with them, 51.7% were married couples living together, 3.4% had a female householder with no husband present, and 24.1% were non-families. 17.2% of all households were made up of individuals, and 0.0% consisted of a sole occupant 65 years of age or older. The average household size was 3.45 and the average family size was 3.91.

In the city, the age distribution of the population shows 43.0% under the age of 18, 2.0% from 18 to 24, 32.0% from 25 to 44, 19.0% from 45 to 64, and 4.0% who were 65 years of age or older. The median age was 29 years. For every 100 females, there were 78.6 males. For every 100 females age 18 and over, there were 128.0 males.

Economics
Both in historic and economic terms, Pilot Point has depended for its existence on the substantial seasonal returns of anadromous Pacific salmon, especially sockeye  (Oncorhynchus nerka) which is the mainstay economic force of the entire region.  Over half of the residents depend directly on the salmon fishery for their livelihood, with a small remainder depending on tourism, sports fishing and hunting, and a few government jobs.

The median income for a household in the city was $41,250, and the median income for a family was $36,250. Males had a median income of $23,750 versus $43,750 for females. The per capita income for the city was $12,627. There were 18.2% of families and 20.8% of the population living below the poverty line, including 18.9% of under eighteens and none of those over 64.

References

External links
 Lake and Peninsula School District

Cities in Alaska
Cities in Lake and Peninsula Borough, Alaska
Populated coastal places in Alaska on the Pacific Ocean